Borislav Đorđević (also transliterated Borislav Djordjević; born 30 October 1953), also known as Boriša Đorđević (Бориша Ђорђевић), is a Serbian former professional footballer who played as a forward. He spent two seasons in the Bundesliga with Hamburger SV.

Honours
 European Cup: 1982–83
 UEFA Cup finalist: 1981–82
 Bundesliga: 1981–82, 1982–83
 Yugoslav First League: 1978–79
 Yugoslav Cup: 1975–76, 1976–77

References

External links
 
 
 

1953 births
Living people
People from Bor, Serbia
Serbian footballers
Yugoslav footballers
Association football forwards
Yugoslavia international footballers
FK Bor players
HNK Hajduk Split players
Hamburger SV players
Tennis Borussia Berlin players
Altonaer FC von 1893 players
Yugoslav First League players
Bundesliga players
Serbian expatriate footballers
Expatriate footballers in West Germany
Yugoslav expatriate footballers
Yugoslav expatriate sportspeople in West Germany